Torchio is an Italian surname. Notable people with the surname include:

J Torchio (born 1960), American football quarterback
Matteo Torchio (born 1983), Italian bobsledder
Philip Torchio (1868–1942), Italian electrical engineer
 Ethan Torchio (born 2000), Italian drummer

Italian-language surnames